Sapinero is an unincorporated community located on U.S. Route 50, along the shore of Blue Mesa Reservoir in the Curecanti National Recreation Area in Gunnison County, Colorado, United States.

History
The community was named after Chief Sapinero, a Ute Indian.

Sapinero's original location was on the north bank of the Gunnison River, just downstream from the mouth of Soap Creek, at approximately (38.47042, -107.30600), about one mile north of its current location. Sapinero was originally a stop on the Denver & Rio Grande Railroad's narrow gauge main line between Denver and Salt Lake City.  The narrow gauge's final abandonment came in 1955. In about 1963, when Blue Mesa Dam was built on the Gunnison River below Sapinero, the town was moved and re-established in its present location, prior to the area's inundation by the water of Blue Mesa Reservoir.

The U.S. Post Office at Gunnison (ZIP Code 81230) now serves Sapinero postal addresses.

Climate
Climate type is dominated by the winter season, a long, bitterly cold period with short, clear days, relatively little precipitation mostly in the form of snow, and low humidity.  The Köppen Climate Classification sub-type for this climate is "Dfc" (Continental Subarctic Climate).

See also

 List of municipalities in Colorado

References

External links

Unincorporated communities in Gunnison County, Colorado
Curecanti National Recreation Area
Unincorporated communities in Colorado